PLAP may refer to:

Private landowner assistance program, in the United States
Placental alkaline phosphatase, an enzyme and tumor marker
Pedro Luís e a Parede, a Brazilian musical group